Live at the Mauch Chunk Opera House is the third album by the Canadian folk trio The Wailin' Jennys.

Production
In the last week of August 2008, alt-folk group The Wailin Jennys arrived at the Mauch Chunk Opera House with the goal of laying down a live recording to capture their performances in the famous Mauch Chunk Opera House, in the town of Jim Thorpe, Pennsylvania.
"Live at the Mauch Chunk Opera House" was recorded during a single day, rather than being compiled from an entire tour.

The album was the Wailin' Jennys' first live album, and their first album since Heather Masse, the group's third alto, joined founding members soprano Ruth Moody and mezzo Nicky Mehta, and since they added instrumentalist Jeremy Penner as sideman.

The Mauch Chunk album features two originals from each of the three members, including Mehta's "Begin," which features prominently in the soundtrack of the movie "The Cake Eaters." Also included are two previously unrecorded long-time concert staples: Jane Siberry's "Calling All Angels" and Ella Jenkins' "Racing with the Sun." The album also features a cappella rendition of Lead Belly's "Bring Me a Li'l Water Silvy," previously recorded by the group on their 2003 debut  EP.

Reception 
It received positive reviews, with The Wailin Jennys frequently performing music from it and their other albums on Prairie Home Companion and other such programs.

Track listing
 "Deeper Well"
 "Summertime"
 "Intro To Driving"
 "Driving"
 "Bold Riley"
 "Intro To Glory Bound"
 "Glory Bound"
 "Arlington"
 "Bring Me Li’l Water Silvy"
 "One More Dollar"
 "Racing With The Sun"
 "Paint A Picture"
 "Intro To Begin"
 "Begin"
 "Motherless Child"
 "Calling All Angels"
 "Intro To One Voice"
 "One Voice"

References

External links
Mauch Chunk, PA, Opera House

2009 live albums
The Wailin' Jennys albums
Red House Records albums